is a passenger railway station located in the town of Sakawa, Takaoka District, Kōchi Prefecture, Japan. It is operated by JR Shikoku and has the station number "K15".

Lines

Layout
The station, which is unstaffed, consists of two opposed side platforms serving a two tracks. A station building linked to platform 1 serves as a waiting room. Access to platform 2 across the tracks is by means of ramps and a level crossing. A siding runs along part of the other side of platform 2.

Adjacent stations

History
At this time the station was operated by Japanese Government Railways, later becoming Japanese National Railways (JNR). With the privatization of JNR on 1 April 1987, control of the station passed to JR Shikoku and JR Freight. Freight operations ceased on 1 October 1992.

Surrounding area
Japan National Route 494
 Sagawa Municipal Togano Elementary School

See also
 List of Railway Stations in Japan

References

External links

 JR Shikoku timetable

Railway stations in Kōchi Prefecture
Railway stations in Japan opened in 1924
Sakawa, Kōchi